Perfect Girls, Starving Daughters; The Frightening New Normalcy of Hating Your Body is a book written by Courtney E. Martin, published by Piatkus in 2007, which looks at socio-cultural, psychological and historical influences that encourage eating disorders in young girls and women.

References

2007 books
Books about emotions